The Social Democratic Students of Sweden (S-Studenter) is the student organisation of the Swedish Social Democratic Party. The organisations acronym is SSF, this acronym is most commonly used in international organisations such as IUSY or YES.

Created again in 1990, the organisation today has about 1200 members spread out over the country, most of them students at either universities or poly-technics. The organisation is today run by Talla Alkurdi, previously a student at Göteborg University, and Sverker Falk-Lissel, a student at Stockholm university.

The Social Democratic Students of Sweden focuses on questions connected to higher education but also organises seminars and debates on various topics such as: international affairs, gender equality, discrimination and equality at the labour market. In recent years the organisation has become a strong voice in the ideological debate within the Swedish Labour Movement. The Social Democratic Students of Sweden was the first social democratic organisation to argue for a Swedish EU (EC) membership and also the first to call for a common European currency. The organisation has also a strong engagement in the movement for democracy in Burma, with which it has worked in partnership since 1996.

Controversy 
In November 2005 the Social Democratic Students of Sweden together with the Swedish Association of Christian Social Democrats and the Muslim Council of Sweden invited the Palestinian-British academic Azzam Tamimi to hold a speech at a seminar at the Stockholm Mosque on the topic "Islam and Democratic Development". This led to strong criticism. Tamimi has referred to Israel as a "cancer" and is especially known for his support for suicide bombings against Israeli civilians.

Chairpersons 

 1990–1992 Ola S. Svensson
 1992–1993 Jesper Bengtsson
 1993–1994 Monica Lövström
 1994–1995 David Samuelsson
 1995–1997 Åsa Kullgren
 1997–1999 Björn Andersson
 1999–2000 Christer Pettersson
 2000–2001 Malin Cederfeldt
 2001–2003 Åsa Westlund
 2003–2005 Eric Sundström
 2005–2007 Magdalena Streijffert
 2007-2010 Kajsa Borgnäs
 2010-2013 Magnus Nilsson
 2013-2015 Talla Alkurdi
 2015-2017 Elin Ylvasdotter
 2017-2019 Nasra Ali
 2019-2021 Malin Malm
 2021-     Emma Fastesson Lindgren

References

External links 
 Official homepage of s-studenter 

Student wings of political parties in Sweden
Student wings of social democratic parties
Swedish Social Democratic Party